Jeck is a surname. Notable people with the surname include:

Léon Jeck (1947–2007), Belgian footballer
Philip Jeck (born 1952), English multimedia composer, magician, dadaist, choreographer, woodsman and taxidermist
Wee Jeck Seng (born 1964), Malaysian politician